Jeff Miller is an American oil executive. He is the chief executive officer, president, and chairman of the board of Halliburton, an oil field service company with operations in over 70 countries.

Early life and education

Jeffrey Allen Miller was born in Dallas, Texas, in 1964. He attended the St. Mark's School of Texas, graduating in 1982.  While at St. Mark's, Miller became interested in rodeo, ultimately earning a rodeo scholarship to McNeese State University. Miller competed briefly in professional rodeo roping before attending Texas A&M University, where he received his Masters in Business Administration.

Career
After receiving his MBA, Miller worked as a certified public accountant at Arthur Andersen, the now defunct accounting firm. Miller moved to Halliburton in 1997.  During his early years at Halliburton, Miller worked in oil field operations in Venezuela, Angola, Indonesia, and Dubai. He moved to Houston in 2010 to assume executive roles in the company, including executive vice president and chief operating officer. Miller was named president in 2014, CEO in 2017, and chairman of the Halliburton board on January 1, 2019.

Controversies
Simultaneous with Miller's assumption of executive responsibilities at Halliburton have been a series of controversies. Miller was the company's president in 2015, when Halliburton—in the face of the oil downturn—terminated 35,000 jobs (40% of its workforce). As the largest contributor to global fracking, the company faces ongoing criticism regarding its ecological impact.

References

1964 births
Businesspeople from Dallas
Living people
McNeese State University alumni
Texas A&M University alumni
Halliburton people